Martinus Ignatius "Mart" Nooij (born July 3, 1954) is a Dutch football manager.

Career
Nooij became a development trainer at the Royal Dutch Football Association. He worked for EVC 1913 in the United States and Kazakhstan. He was manager of the Burkina Faso U-20 team at the 2003 FIFA World Youth Championship. In 2004, he was temporarily assistant-coach at Dutch side FC Volendam.

In 2007, he was appointed head coach of the Mozambique national football team. As the manager of Mozambique he qualified the squad for the 2010 African Cup of Nations following a 12-year hiatus from the tournament finals. Mozambique finished bottom of their group with one draw and two losses. After failing to reach the 2012 African Cup of Nations, Nooij resigned from his managerial position in September 2011. He was replaced by German coach Gert Engels.

On 19 April 2012, he was named as the head coach of Premier Soccer League side Santos, but was sacked 18 December 2012.

In November 2013, Nooij became the head coach of the Ethiopian side Saint George and five months later, he accepted the head coaching job of Tanzania on 25 April 2014. He was sacked in June 2015.

References

External links

 Mark Nooij Interview

1954 births
Living people
Dutch football managers
Dutch expatriate football managers
Mozambique national football team managers
Tanzania national football team managers
Expatriate football managers in Ethiopia
People from Heemskerk
2010 Africa Cup of Nations managers
Dutch expatriate sportspeople in Mozambique
Dutch expatriate sportspeople in Ethiopia
Dutch expatriate sportspeople in South Africa
Expatriate soccer managers in South Africa
Dutch expatriate sportspeople in Tanzania
Sportspeople from North Holland